Chad States (born 1975) is an American photographer and artist, living in Philadelphia, Pennsylvania. His photographic series include Cruising and Masculinities.

Early life and education
States was born in Edmonds, Washington. He holds a BA from Evergreen State College and an MFA from Tyler School of Art and Architecture.

Life and work
States lives in Philadelphia, Pennsylvania, where he is a member of the Vox Populi artist collective. In 2009 we was an artist-in-residence at Light Work in Syracuse, New York.

States is a gay man. His work is concerned with questions of masculinity and vulnerability, specifically pursued in a landscape of queer sex and desire.

Cruising (2011) is a book of photographs of men cruising for sex outdoors in parks. "The subjects are anonymous, often appearing only partially, obscured by vegetation or shadows", and only a small part of the picture among the lush forestry of their surroundings. Having initially worked solely with photography, since 2012/13 States has also worked with other mediums.

For his Masculinities series, States placed an ad on Craigslist seeking anyone who identified as being masculine. His subjects were mostly cisgendered men, but also included a few trans men, and women. He "met the subjects at their homes, where he photographed them in poses and scenarios they themselves dictated." The "variety proves how impossible it is to fit masculinity into one box or to define it simply. Each person States photographs crafts their own idea of masculinity". Accompanying each portrait is a quote describing what it means to them to be manly.

States has said:
"I'm a big fan of [Katy Grannan]. Her work feels very cruel and very tender at the same time and I love that idea of exploitation, of power dynamics. It makes the images exciting. I try to make work that creates a discussion about exploitation. I find the idea of, "How much am I exploiting the subject here?" very interesting."

Publications

Publications by States
Cruising. Brooklyn: powerHouse, 2011. With texts by Gordon Brent Ingram and Alec Soth. .
Trade. First edition. Philadelphia: self-published, 2012. Loose-leaf collection of photographs. Edition of 40 copies.
Trade. Summer Edition / second edition. Philadelphia: self-published, 2012. Loose-leaf collection of photographs. Edition of 40 copies.
Trade. Winter Edition. Philadelphia: self-published, 2013. Loose-leaf collection of photographs. Edition of 40 copies.

Publications with contributions by States
 Alec Soth's Lonely Boy Mag. Issue 2: Boys and Their Cars. St. Paul, MN: Little Brown Mushroom, 2011. Text and photographs by States (Give or Take), Alec Soth (The Most Beautiful Woman in Georgia) and Todd Hido (Suburban Souls), and erotic dioramas by Peter Davidson. Edition of 1000 copies.

Group exhibitions
Into the Woods, ClampArt, New York City, 2012. Included work from Cruising.
Blue Sky Gallery, Portland, Oregon, 2014. Included work from Cruising.

Collections
States' work is held in the following permanent collection:
Jule Collins Smith Museum of Fine Art, Auburn University, Auburn, Alabama: 1 print (as of May 2021)

References

External links

"Chad States Shoots Strangers Having Sex in the Forest", interview about Cruising at Vice
"Interview: Photographer Chad States on Cruising", interview about Cruising at The Fader
"Men at Their Most Masculine", gallery of photographs and interview about Masculinities at The Morning News
States talks about various photography projects at Blue Sky Gallery, 2014 (video, 30 mins)

21st-century American artists
21st-century American photographers
American photographers
Temple University Tyler School of Art alumni
Evergreen State College alumni
LGBT people from Washington (state)
American LGBT photographers
Date of birth missing (living people)
1975 births
Living people
21st-century American LGBT people